Hanieh  Rostamian   (born 11 September 1998) is an Iranian sports shooter. She represented Iran at the 2020 Summer Olympics in the Women's 10 metre air pistol event, where she placed tenth, and in the 10 metre air pistol mixed team event, where her team placed fifth. She was also one of Iran's two flag bearers. She also won Iran's first quota for the  2024 Summer Olympics.

Major achievements
Senior
2022 ISSF World Cup, Rio de Janeiro –  (AP10 team)
2019 ISSF World Cup, New Delhi –  (AP60)
2019 Universiade, Naples –  (AP60)
Junior
2017 Asian Airgun Championships, Wako –  (AP40 team)
Youth
2013 Asian Airgun Championships, Tehran –  (AP40),  (AP40 team)
2014 Asian Airgun Championships, Kuwait City –  (AP40 team)
2015 Asian Airgun Championships, New Delhi –  (AP40),  (AP40 team)
2016 Asian Airgun Championships, Tehran –  (AP40 team)

References

External links
Hanieh Rostamian at ISSF
Hanieh Rostamian at Olympic

1998 births
Sportspeople from Tehran
Living people
Iranian female sport shooters
Shooters at the 2018 Asian Games
Universiade medalists in shooting
Universiade silver medalists for Iran
Medalists at the 2019 Summer Universiade
Islamic Solidarity Games competitors for Iran
Islamic Solidarity Games medalists in shooting
Shooters at the 2020 Summer Olympics
Olympic shooters of Iran
21st-century Iranian women